Arnold Kransdorff is an American author and consultant who has researched knowledge management.

Kransdorff first identified the phenomenon of corporate amnesia. This was documented in his first book, Corporate Amnesia. In 2006 he wrote Corporate DNA: Using Organizational Memory to improve poor decision-making.

He owns the consulting firm 'Pencorp'.

References 

American business writers
Living people
Year of birth missing (living people)